China Sandi Holdings Limited (Short name, China Sandi Holdings), formerly China Grand Forestry Resources Group Limited and China Grand Forestry Green Resources Group Limited, is a public company engaged in the ecological forestry business in China. It involves in tree plantation and the manufacture and distribution of timber.

It was established in 1991 with the origin name of Good Fellow Group Limited. It was listed on the Hong Kong Stock Exchange in 1998. It is headquartered in Hong Kong.

References

External links
chinasandi.com.hk

Companies listed on the Hong Kong Stock Exchange
Forest products companies of Hong Kong
Privately held companies of China
Renewable resource companies established in 1991
Chinese companies established in 1991
1991 establishments in Hong Kong